Vivekanand Education Society's Polytechnic (VESP) is a Polytechnic College  located in Chembur, in India It is affiliated to the Maharastra Board of Technical Education (MSBTE) and has been approved by AICTE.

Campus
The campus is located in Chembur, a northeastern suburb of Mumbai. It has playground and other activities like Yoga, Music, Vedanta aids in shaping budding engineers. It has at present about 1400 students, 67 faculty members, 42 well equipped laboratories having instruments worth Rs. 5.14 cr. and 53 administrative and supportive staff.

Departments
Computer Engineering (Intake - 120 seats)
Automation and Robotics (Intake - 60 seats)
Communication Engineering (Intake - 60 seats)
Civil Engineering (Intake - 60 seats)
Mechanical Engineering (Intake - 60 seats)
Electrical Engineering (Intake - 60 seats)
– source

Accreditation
V.E.S. Polytechnic is affiliated to Maharashtra Board of Technical Education (MSBTE) and has been approved by AICTE.

Computer Engineering, Instrumentation Engineering and Communication Engineering Departments are Provisionally Accredited by National Board of Accreditation (NBA)

References

External links
VESP homepage

Educational institutions established in 1983
1983 establishments in Maharashtra
Education in Mumbai